The 190th Brigade was a brigade of the British Army during the First World War. It was formed in France in 1916, and assigned to the 63rd (Royal Naval) Division and served on the Western Front.

Formation
The infantry battalions did not all serve at once, but all were assigned to the brigade during the war.
7th (Extra Reserve) Battalion, Royal Fusiliers (SR)
4th (Extra Reserve) Battalion, Bedfordshire Regiment (SR)
1/1st Battalion, Honourable Artillery Company (TF)
10th Battalion, Royal Dublin Fusiliers
1/28th Battalion, London Regiment (Artists Rifles) (TF)
1/4th Battalion, King's Shropshire Light Infantry (TF)
190th Machine Gun Company 	
190th Trench Mortar Battery

References

Infantry brigades of the British Army in World War I